Meral Perin (born 1965) is a Turkish-German actress.

Filmography

Television

References

External links

1965 births
German people of Turkish descent
German film actresses
Living people
German television actresses